The canton of Rennes-1 is an administrative division of the Ille-et-Vilaine department, in northwestern France. It was created at the French canton reorganisation which came into effect in March 2015. Its seat is in Rennes.

The canton is entirely included in the commune of Rennes.

Councillors

Detailed election results

2015 
The departmental elections of 2015 was held on 22 (first round) and 29 (second round) March 2019.

2021 
The departmental election of 2021 was held on 20 (first round) and 27 (second round) June 2021.

References

Cantons of Ille-et-Vilaine